Oleksandr Kormich is a Soviet and Ukrainian former professional footballer played as a defender.

Career
Oleksandr Kormich started his career with Cheksyl Chernihiv the club in Chernihiv, in 1992 where he won the Chernihiv Oblast Football Championship in 1992. In the season 1993-1994 he played 20 matches. In summer 1994, he moved to the main club of the city Desna Chernihiv, where he played 16 matches and scored 2 goals. In January 1995, he returned to Cheksyl Chernihiv where he playing 12 matches. In summer 1995 he moved to Desna Chernihiv where the club was in Ukrainian Second League here he played 17 matches where with the club got 7th place in the season 1995–96. In the season 1996–97 he played 2 matches with the club of Chernihiv and then in January 1997 he had been transferred to Domostroitel Chernihiv, where he ended his career without playing.

Honours
Cheksyl Chernihiv
 Chernihiv Oblast Football Championship: 1992

References

External links 
 Oleksandr Kormich allplayers.in.ua

1972 births
Living people
Footballers from Chernihiv
Soviet footballers
Ukrainian footballers
Association football defenders
FC Desna Chernihiv players
FC Cheksyl Chernihiv players
Ukrainian First League players
Ukrainian Premier League players